This is a list of all former coaches of Qarabağ FK.  Current coach Gurban Gurbanov took over from Rasim Kara on the July 2008.

Managers

References

Qarabağ FK managers
Qarabağ